Henri Hell, pseudonym for José Enrique Lasry (1916 – April 1991) was a French art, music and literary critic, as well as a musicologist.

Biography 
He assisted  in the management of the magazine Fontaine. He was a music critic at la Revue Musicale, Nouveau Candide, la Table Ronde, the Gazette de Lausanne, Mercure de France. He directed the Fayard publishing house. Finally, he published a reference book on Francis Poulenc at the same house. He was also an art columnist.

Bibliography 
1944: La France au cœur : Chroniques de la servitude et de la libération, juin 1940–juin 1943, foreword to the work by Max-Pol Fouchet
1957: Les Élus du Seigneur, French translation of Go Tell It on the Mountain by James Baldwin
1958: Francis Poulenc, musicien français, Plon, Fayard, 1978. Read online in English
1962: L'univers romanesque de Marguerite Duras
1990: Un regard, preface of the work by Stephen Spender
 Correspondence with René Étiemble
 Correspondence with François Nourissier
 Correspondence with Francis Poulenc, 1951

References 

French literary critics
French art critics
French music critics
20th-century French musicologists
20th-century French journalists
1916 births
1991 deaths